Patricia Bottani (born 17 November 1974) is a Swiss equestrian. She competed in two events at the 2000 Summer Olympics.

References

External links
 

1974 births
Living people
Swiss female equestrians
Swiss dressage riders
Olympic equestrians of Switzerland
Equestrians at the 2000 Summer Olympics
Sportspeople from Zürich